The Cayman Islands competed at the 1992 Summer Olympics in Barcelona, Spain. Ten competitors, all men, took part in seven events in three sports.

Competitors
The following is the list of number of competitors in the Games.

Athletics

Men's 100m metres
Kareem Streete-Thompson 
 Heat — 10.78 (→ did not advance)

Men's Long Jump
Kareem Streete-Thompson 
 Qualification — 7.39 m (→ did not advance)

Cycling

Six cyclists represented the Cayman Islands in 1992.

Men's road race
 Dennis Brooks
 Michele Smith
 Stefan Baraud

Men's team time trial
 Alfred Ebanks
 Don Campbell
 Craig Merren
 Stefan Baraud

Men's 1 km time trial
 Don Campbell

Sailing

See also
Cayman Islands at the 1991 Pan American Games

References

External links
Official Olympic Reports

Nations at the 1992 Summer Olympics
1992
Olympics